Paonia Dam is a dam in Gunnison County, Colorado.

The earthen dam was a project of the United States Bureau of Reclamation.  Built between 1959 and 1962 for irrigation storage, it stands 199 feet high and 770 feet across at its crest.

The lake it creates, Paonia Reservoir, has a surface area of 334 acres with a total capacity of 20,950 acre-feet and a normal capacity of 18,150 acre-feet.  The recreational facilities of Paonia State Park include campsites, picnic sites and a boat ramp. Geologic formations from the Cretaceous and Paleocene periods are visible in the park, along with fossilized palm fronds and leaf imprints.  Park uplands are gambel oak shrublands along with mixed conifer and aspen forests. Commonly seen wildlife includes, mule deer, elk, cottontail rabbit and marmot.

References 

Dams in Colorado
Reservoirs in Colorado
United States Bureau of Reclamation dams
Buildings and structures in Gunnison County, Colorado
Earth-filled dams
Dams completed in 1962
Dams in the Colorado River basin
Lakes of Gunnison County, Colorado
1962 establishments in Colorado